Mantiis – An Agony in Fourteen Bites (2012) is the first studio album by Barcelona-based band Obsidian Kingdom. It is a concept album featuring a single song divided into fourteen tracks, noted for reflecting a broad range of emotions through a great variety of genres. The album was recorded, mixed and produced by Jorge Mur and the band at Ax Studios in Barcelona, and mastered by Jens Bogren at Fascination Street Studios. The artwork of the physical edition was in charge of Elena Gallen, under art direction by Ritxi Ostáriz and the band itself.

Critical reception

Mantiis was well received critically, obtaining positive reviews during 2012 and 2013, which praised the complex fusion of different genres, the originality of the proposal and the quality of its sound production.

Track listing

Personnel

Band members 
Rider G Omega – guitar and vocals
Prozoid Zeta JSI – guitar
Zer0 Æmeour Íggdrasil – keyboards and vocals
Fleast Race O'Uden – bass
Ojete Mordaza II – drums

Other personnel

Nicholas Dominic Talvola – trumpet on "Last of the Light"
Fiar – vocals on "Awake Until Dawn"

References 

Concept albums
Obsidian Kingdom albums
2012 albums